The National Highway 120 or the N-120 is one of Pakistan National Highway running from Hyderabad to the town of Khokhrapar via Mirpur Khas, Umerkot in Sindh province of Pakistan. Its total length is 220 km, the highway is maintained and operated by Pakistan's National Highway Authority.

See also

References

External links
 National Highway Authority

Roads in Pakistan